Otiorhynchus morio is one of the many species in the weevil family (Curculionidae). It was first described by German entomologist Ernst Friedrich Germar in 1824.

References

External links 
 Encyclopedia of Life page on Otiorhynchus morio

Entiminae
Beetles described in 1824